Rafael Gómez Ortega, (1882 – 1960) also known as El Gallo ("the rooster") was an early twentieth century bullfighter. He came from a family of famous bullfighters, including his matador father, Fernando Gómez García and matador younger brother, José Gómez Ortega. He is today remembered for several of his unique fighting techniques such as the espantada - or "sudden flight", which simply consisted of him fleeing when the bull entered the ring. Other techniques included fighting bulls from a chair. 

His fights were considered amusing to audiences, and he was brought out of retirement seven times because of this "sportsmanship". He finally retired on October 4, 1936. Commentators find that his intermittent fear of the bulls was characteristic of his style, noting that he was often brave when it suited him, and gave in to panic when it did not.

Ortega later wasted his fortune, and was supported by Juan Belmonte. He was briefly married to Pastora Imperio, a famous flamenco dancer.

He died on 25 May 1960 at the age of 77.

References

External links 
El Gallo's Biography (in Spanish)

1882 births
1960 deaths
Spanish bullfighters